Triparadeisos or Triparadisus was a settlement in Lebanon near the sources of the Orontes. A paradeisos was a hunting reserve or pleasure-ground for the nobility of the Achaemenid (Persian) Empire, normally a walled-in area with groves of trees, wild animals, and running water.

Triparadeisos was the place where the Treaty of Triparadisus occurred, in which Alexander the Great's Empire was divided between his generals in 321 BC. It has been suggested that it was at the site of Roman Heliopolis (modern Baalbek). Heliopolis was a colony of the Roman Empire in what is now Lebanon. The name was Colonia Julia Augusta Felix Heliopolitana.

Early History

Ancient Triparadeisos -later named Heliopolis- initially formed part of the Diadochi kingdoms of Egypt & Syria. It had a small population of one thousand inhabitants during Alexander times.

It was annexed by the Romans during their eastern wars. The Italic settlers of the Roman colony "Colonia Julia Augusta Felix Heliopolitana" may have arrived as early as the time of Caesar but were more probably the veterans of two Roman Legions under Augustus, during which time it hosted a Roman garrison.

Indeed the veterans of two Roman legions were established in the city (and region) of Berytus by emperor Augustus: the fifth Macedonian and the third Gallic., and Heliopolis from 15 BC to 193 AD formed part of the territory of Berytus.  The population -probably nearly 15000 inhabitants- was mainly local in the second century under Hadrian with a few descendants of the Roman colonists and likely varied seasonally with market fairs and the schedules of the caravans to the coast and interior.

According to Schlumberger, during the Roman conquest the city's temple to Baʿal & Haddu was conflated first with the worship of the Greek sun god Helios and then with the Greek and Roman sky god under the name "Heliopolitan Zeus" or "Jupiter". The present Temple of Jupiter (the biggest in Antiquity) presumably replaced an earlier one of Triparadeisos using the same foundations.

Roman Heliopolis 

Triparadeisos/Heliopolis from 15 BC to 193 AD formed part of the territory of Berytus and was partially romanized.  

During Classical Antiquity, the city's temple to Baʿal & Haddu was conflated first with the worship of the Greek sun god Helios and then with the Greek and Roman sky god under the name "Heliopolitan Zeus" or "Jupiter". The present Temple of Jupiter presumably replaced an earlier one of Triparadeisos using the same foundation. The presence of a huge quarry was one of the reasons for the Roman decision to create a huge "Great Court" of a big pagan temple complex in this mountain site, located at nearly 1100 meters of altitude and on the eastern Borders of the Roman Empire: it took three centuries to create this colossal Roman paganism's temple complex, called Sanctuary of Heliopolis.

Heliopolis was a noted oracle and pilgrimage site, whence the cult spread far afield, with inscriptions to the Heliopolitan god discovered in Athens, Rome, Pannonia, Venetia, Gaul, and near the Wall in Britain. The Roman 
temple complex grew up from the early part of the reign of Augustus in the late 1st century until the rise of Christianity in the 4th century. The 6th-century chronicles of John Malalas of Antioch, which claimed Triparadeisos/Heliopolis as a "wonder of the world" credited most of the complex to the 2nd-century Antoninus Pius. By that time, the complex housed three temples: one to Jupiter Heliopolitanus (Baʿal), one to Venus Heliopolitana (Ashtart), and a third to Bacchus. On a nearby hill, a fourth temple was dedicated to the third figure of the Heliopolitan Triad, Mercury (Adon). 

Ultimately, the site vied with Praeneste in Italy as the two largest sanctuaries in the Western world.

The emperor Trajan consulted the site's oracle twice. In 193 AD, Septimius Severus granted the city the famous ius Italicum rights and the city grew in importance in all the Roman Levant.

In the third century Triparadeisos started to be called only Heliopolis and had a population of nearly 20000 inhabitants. There was an hippodrome with even a theater, just outside the "Great Court" area of the temples. Additionally a temple of Mercury stood on top of the hill outside the ramparts. A long staircase led up to it from the town, as is shown on coins of Heliopolis struck under emperor Philip the Arab. Remains of the temple, the line of the staircase, and parts of its parapet have been found. Still remain some sections of the Roman walls, with square forts around the old city

Under Constantine the Great Christianity was declared officially the religion of the Roman empire and the pagan Temples of Heliopolis started to be neglected. Later the Byzantines used some materials from the abandoned temples

With the arab conquest the city fell to nearly complete ruins and only one hundred inhabitants remained there in the late eight century.

Monoliths

Triparadeisos/Heliopolis contains some of the biggest monoliths of Classical Antiquity, including the Roman Trilithon and the Stone of the Pregnant Woman:

References

Bibliography
 Beydoun, Ahmad. Le Liban, une histoire disputée: identité et temps dans l'histoire libanaise contemporaine Beyrouth, Publications de l'Université Libanaise, 1984.
 Carter, Terry & Dunston, Lara. Libano  Torino, EDT, 2004. 
 Cook, Arthur Bernard. Zeus: A Study in Ancient Religion. volume=Vol. I: Zeus God of the Bright Sky. Cambridge. Cambridge University Press, 1914

See also
Temple of Jupiter (Roman Heliopolis)
Berytus
Roman Phoenicia

Roman sites in Lebanon
Former populated places in Lebanon